Stylosphaeridae is a family of radiolarians in the order Spumellaria. According to the original description by Ernst Haeckel, members of the family have a spherical central capsule within a fenestrated spherical siliceous shell,  with two radial spines opposite in one axis. They are solitary. i.e. not associated in colonies.

References

External links

Polycystines
Radiolarian families